Rochester Institute of Technology has over 135,000 alumni from all 50 U.S. states and over 100 countries.  This is a list of some notable alumni.

Government
 John Cebrowski – member of the New Hampshire House of Representatives
 Brian Chontosh (2000) – United States Marine Corps officer, Navy Cross Recipient
 Robert J. Duffy (1993) – Lieutenant Governor of New York (2011–2014); mayor, (2006–2010) City of Rochester; past Chief of Police, City of Rochester
 David Egan (1962) – New York State Supreme Court Justice
 Bruce James – former Public Printer of the United States
 Fiona Ma – California State Assembly Majority Whip and a San Francisco politician
 Tom McMahon – Mayor of Reading, Pennsylvania
 Rodney C. Moen – Wisconsin State Senator

Science and Engineering
 Kate Gleason – engineer and businesswoman known both for being a revolutionary in the predominantly male field of engineering and for her philanthropy
 Ralph Peo – engineer, inventor, chairman and CEO of Houdaille Industries, 1957 alumnus of the year
Patricia Moore (1974) – industrial designer, gerontologist and author of Disguised: A True Story(1985) ;Recognized by ID Magazine as one of the "40 Most Socially Conscious Designers" in the world
 Steve Capps (1980) – noted computer programmer and designer of the original Apple Macintosh computer
 Steven Van Slyke (1988) – co-inventor of the Organic Light Emitting Diode (OLED) displays used in smartphones, digital cameras, HD and Ultra HDTVs
 Rick Kittles (1989) –  noted Biologist specializing in Human genetics
 Bob Kalka (1989) – vice president of the Security Business Unit at IBM 
 Elan Lee (1998) – founder and creator of Exploding Kittens game; former chief design officer at Xbox Entertainment Studios; alternate reality game designer
Alex Kipman (2001) –  primary inventor of Kinect and HoloLens
 John Resig (2006) – creator of jQuery

Humanities
 Kwaku Alston (1994) – celebrity portrait photographer
 Barbara Astman (1970) – artist, photographer
 Ralph Avery (1928) – artist
 Paul Benoit (1976) – Feature Pulitzer Prize, Boston Herald in 1979
 Bernie Boston (1955) – photojournalist, twice nominated for a Pulitzer Prize, including his 1967 Flower Power photo
 Marilyn Bridges (1979, 1981) – aerial photographer
 Robert F. Bukay (1982) – Pulitzer Prize-winning photographer for feature photography with the Associated Press in 1999
 Dean Chamberlain (1977) – effect photographer
 Emma Lampert Cooper (1897) – painter
 Jeff Daly – chief designer of the Metropolitan Museum of Art
 Bruce Davidson – photographer
 Ken Geiger (1985) – Pulitzer Prize-winning photojournalist for spot news with The Dallas Morning News in 1993
 Stan Grossfeld (1973) – two-time Pulitzer Prize-winning photojournalist with the Boston Globe in 1984 and 1985
 James D. Havens (ca 1920) – woodblock printmaker, painter, and first American insulin recipient
 N. Katherine Hayles (1966) – critical theorist
 Tom Hussey –  photographer specializing in commercial advertising and lifestyle photography
 Kenneth Josephson (1932) – photographer; founder of the Society for Photographic Education
 Jeannette Klute – Kodak research photographer who helped develop the Dye-transfer process and demonstrated color photography as an art form
 Bryan Kocis – founder of Cobra Video
 Leon Lim – artist, contestant on Work of Art: The Next Great Artist
 Dan Loh (1995) – Pulitzer Prize-winning photojournalist for feature photography with the Associated Press in 1999
 Mary Lum (artist) – visual artist, recipient of Guggenheim Fellowship, professor at Bennington College
 Zwelethu Mthethwa (1989) – South African painter and photographer
 David Muench – landscape and nature photographer
 Elli Perkins – professional glass artist
 Fredericka Douglass Sprague Perry – activist, philanthropist 
 Wallace Seawell (1940) – Hollywood photographer
 Daria Semegen – composer of classical music
 Ronald Senungetuk – Inupiat artist
 William Snyder (1981) – four-time Pulitzer Prize-winning photojournalist; director of photography, Dallas Morning News
 David Spindel – photographer
 Anthony Suau (1978) – Pulitzer Prize-winning photojournalist for feature photography with the Denver Post in 1978
 Emily Thompson (1984) – associate professor of history, University of San Diego; 2005 MacArthur Foundation Fellow
 Jerry Uelsmann (1957) – photographer, darkroom artist and Professor Emeritus of the University of Florida
 Craig Varjabedian – photographer
 Eloise Wilkin (1923) – illustrator for Little Golden Books

Social Sciences
 Thomas R Keene – economist for Bloomberg News
 C. A. Tripp – psychologist and writer

Arts & Design
 Mike Battle (2002) – digital restoration artist
 Brian Bram – comic artist for American Splendor, founder of two interactive agencies in Boston
 Kei Ito (2014) – contemporary photographer and installation artist
 Elan Lee (1998) – alternate reality game designer
 Junco Sato Pollack – contemporary artist
 Todd Chadwick Wilson – director
 Chuck Baird (1974) – deaf artist and one of the founders of the De'VIA art movement
 Sean Forbes (2008) – co-founder of D-PAN, the Deaf Professional Arts Network
 Adam Kubert (1981) – comics artist known for his work for publishers such as Marvel Comics and DC Comics
 David Spindel (born 1941), photographer
 Glynis Sweeny (1984) – illustrator and nationally recognized caricaturist

Journalism & Media
 Liz Bonis (1988) – reporter, WKRC-TV, Cincinnati (Clear Channel Communications), Channel 13 WHAM-TV
 Gale Gand (1981) – cookbook author, chef and host of TV Food Network's Sweet Dreams
 Katie Linendoll (2005) – tech expert on A&E's We Mean Business
 Debra Meiburg – wine journalist, Master of Wine holder
Jack Van Antwerp  (1986) – former director of photography for The Wall Street Journal
 Frederick Elmes (1986) – cinematographer, two-time winner of the Independent Spirit Award for Best Cinematography
 Michael Slovis (1976) – cinematographer and television director, including Breaking Bad, Better Call Saul

Business
 Donald N. Boyce (1967) – chairman of the board, IDEX Corporation
 William A. Buckingham (1964) –  executive vice president of M&T Bank
 Daniel Carp (1973) – former chairman and CEO of the Eastman Kodak Company
 Tom Curley (1977) – president and CEO, Associated Press
 Jeffrey K. Harris (1975) – vice president and managing director for Situational Awareness Systems, Lockheed Martin Integrated Systems and Solutions
 Roger W. Kober (1984) – chairman and CEO, Rochester Gas & Electric Corporation
 Ralph Peo (1915) – founder of Frontier Industries and former CEO and Chairman of Houdaille Industries 
 Mike Rundle – co-founder, 9rules Network
 Kevin Surace (1985) – entrepreneur, CEO of Appvance, CNBC Innovator of the Decade
Robert Fabbio (1985) – venture capitalist, founder of Tivoli Systems and WhileGlove Health

Sports
 Alex Crepinsek – National Lacrosse League player for the Minnesota Swarm
 Matt Hamill – champion wrestler at NCAA Division III and 2001 Summer Deaflympics; Ultimate Fighting Championship mixed martial artist
 Steve Pinizzotto – Canadian professional ice hockey player
 Jerry Ragonese – Major League Lacrosse player for the Rochester Rattlers
 Chris Tanev – National Hockey League player for the Calgary Flames
 Steve Toll – National Lacrosse League Player
 John Williams – equestrian Olympic bronze medal winner

References

Footnotes

Alumni
Rochester Institute of Technology alumni